was a Japanese Rinzai Rōshi, a successor in the Tenryū-ji line of Rinzai Zen, and former president of Hanazono University, the Rinzai university in Kyoto, Japan. He became a priest in 1945.

Biography
Ōmori Sōgen was a teacher of Kashima Shinden Jikishinkage-ryū swordsmanship, and a calligrapher in the Taishi school of Yamaoka Tesshū. He became well known for his unique approach to Zen practice integrating insights from his martial and fine arts training with traditional Zen methods; this approach has been described as a unity of Zen, Ken ("sword", referring to martial arts or physical culture), and Sho ("brush", referring to calligraphy or fine arts).

Ōmori founded Seitai-ji monastery in Japan and Daihonzan Chozen-ji in Honolulu, Hawaii, the first Rinzai headquarters temple established outside Japan according to Rinzai canon law.

Dharma successors and descendants of Omori Roshi are active in both Japan and the West. In the United States, along with Chozen-ji, Daiyuzenji has been established in Chicago, and Korinji near Madison, Wisconsin.  In Germany and Austria, there are active groups connected to Sasaki Gensō Rōshi and Hozumi Genshō Rōshi.

Ōmori is the author of more than 20 books in the Japanese language.

Ōmori was also well known for his right-wing ultra-nationalist political activism and influence in government circles prior to the outbreak of the Second World War.

Notable students
Sasaki Gensō Rōshi
Kadowaki Kakichi Roshi, Author "Zen and the Bible"

Tanouye Tenshin Roshi
Hozumi Gensho Roshi
Hosokawa Dogen Roshi
Shiohira Hideki Sensei

Bibliography

Sogen, Omori; Tanouye Tenshin (1989). Zen & Budo. Daihonzan Chozen-ji / International Zen Dojo Honolulu. .

References

Sources

Further reading

External links
 Chozen-ji
 Daiyuzenji
 Korinji
  Ryu-un Zendo
  Chart showing the Rinzai lineage of Omori Sogen Roshi

Japanese calligraphers
Rinzai Buddhists
Zen Buddhist priests
Japanese Zen Buddhists
Japanese religious leaders
Japanese swordfighters
1994 deaths
1904 births